In psychology, the four stages of competence, or the "conscious competence" learning model, relates to the psychological states involved in the process of progressing from incompetence to competence in a skill. People may have several skills, some unrelated to each other, and each skill will typically be at one of the stages at a given time. Many skills require practice to remain at a high level of competence.

History
Management trainer Martin M. Broadwell described the model as "the four levels of teaching" in February 1969. Paul R. Curtiss and Phillip W. Warren mentioned the model in their 1973 book The Dynamics of Life Skills Coaching. The model was used at Gordon Training International by its employee Noel Burch in the 1970s; there it was called the "four stages for learning any new skill". Later the model was frequently attributed to Abraham Maslow, incorrectly since the model does not appear in his major works.

Overview
The four stages suggest that individuals are initially unaware of how little they know, or unconscious of their incompetence. As they recognize their incompetence, they consciously acquire a skill, then consciously use it. Eventually, the skill can be utilized without it being consciously thought through: the individual is said to have then acquired unconscious competence.

Several elements, including helping someone "know what they don't know" or recognize a blind spot, can be compared to some elements of a Johari window, although Johari deals with self-awareness, while the four stages of competence deals with learning stages.

Stages
The four stages are:
 Unconscious incompetence
 The individual does not understand or know how to do something and does not necessarily recognize the deficit. They may deny the usefulness of the skill. The individual must recognize their own incompetence, and the value of the new skill, before moving on to the next stage. The length of time an individual spends in this stage depends on the strength of the stimulus to learn. 
 Conscious incompetence
 Though the individual does not understand or know how to do something, they recognize the deficit, as well as the value of a new skill in addressing the deficit. The making of mistakes can be integral to the learning process at this stage.
 Conscious competence
 The individual understands or knows how to do something. However, demonstrating the skill or knowledge requires concentration. It may be broken down into steps, and there is heavy conscious involvement in executing the new skill.
 Unconscious competence
 The individual has had so much practice with a skill that it has become "second nature" and can be performed easily. As a result, the skill can be performed while executing another task. The individual may be able to teach it to others, depending upon how and when it was learned.

See also

References

Further reading
A few examples among many peer-reviewed articles that mention the four stages:

 
 
 
 
 
 
 
 
 
 
 
 

Skills
Learning theory (education)
Stage theories